Beloye Lake is a lake in Beshankovichy District, Vitebsk Region, Belarus in the basin of Charnagosnitsa River,  east of Beshankovichy.

Near the lake are the villages of Gorodets, Zabelye and Maly Pavlovich.

The slopes of the basin on the east side of the lake are up to 3 meters high, while in the west they are steep and reach 20 meters. The beach merges with the slopes of the basin, and at the northern and southern end of the lake are swampy. Vegetation extends to a depth of  into the lake streams and stream flows in Ostrovenskoe lake.

References

Lakes of Vitebsk Region